Los Trotamúsicos (also known as "The Four Musicians of Bremen" and Die Abenteuer der Bremer Stadtmusikanten in Germany) was a Spanish animated series produced by Estudios Cruz Delgado for Televisión Española and first broadcast in 1989.

Based on the Brothers Grimm story, Town Musicians of Bremen, the series follows the story of four animal friends who form a band in the playing respectively guitar, drums, trumpet and saxophone.

In 1997, it was dubbed into English dub as a compilation film titled Once Upon a Tune.

Episodes
 
 La fuga de Koky - Koky the Rooster runs from the Farm to escape death, and encounters a mistreated Donkey named Tonto, and later, a canine named Lupo, who is taken for granted by a man who fakes being blind.
 Atraco en el bosque - Koky and the others take refuge in a house, where They meet a Feline named Burlon. Meanwhile, Three Thieves steal a golden trumpet from the Burgemeister.
 Casa de fantasmas - The Four Musicians first encounter the Thieves, and must escape capture when they accidentally acquire the golden trumpet.
 ¡Todos a Bremen! - The Four Musicians arrive at Bremen while still trying to avoid the Thieves, and return the Golden Trumpet to the Burgemeister.
 Los amigos del bosque
 El quinto músico
 El tesoro de la gruta
 El rapto de Tonto
 Tropiezos y trapecios
 Las genialidades del genio ingenioso
 La aventura del montgolfo
 ¡Menudo equipo!
 Ladrones Navideños
 El gigante bondadoso
 El gas bailarin
 La merienda del lobo
 Una aventura cañon
 El laberinto perdido
 El Pequeño elefante blanco 
 El regreso de Rat Rater
 Contra golpe, golpetazo
 Aventura en la granja
 El extraño caso raro
 El primo guasón
 Búsqueda en el bosque
 Un grupo inseparable

References

1989 Spanish television series debuts
Spanish children's animated musical television series
Television shows based on short fiction
1980s Spanish television series
RTVE shows